Ross Vincent Turnbull was a rugby union player who represented Australia against Ireland in one test match in 1968.

Turnbull, a prop, was born in Newcastle, New South Wales. He was the tour manager for the 1975–76 Australia rugby union tour of Britain and Ireland.

References

Australian rugby union players
Australia international rugby union players
1941 births
2015 deaths
Deaths from cancer
Rugby union props
Rugby union players from Newcastle, New South Wales